Tracee Chimo Pallero is an American stage, television and film actress who became an arts critic favorite after her 2012 breakout role as Daphna Feygenbaum, the antagonist in Joshua Harmon’s hit dark comedy Bad Jews.

In 2018 she married Canadian cameraman Richard Joseph Pallero, after meeting and falling in love on the set of her first television series, TBS’ cult comedy People of Earth.

Early life
Chimo was born in Saugus, Massachusetts. Her father is of Albanian descent and her mother is of Irish and Italian ancestry (her father is an Albanian Orthodox Christian, and her mother is Catholic). She splits her time between living in Los Angeles and New York City.

Career
Chimo's 2010 work in the plays Bachelorette and Circle Mirror Transformation was praised by Erik Piepenburg of The New York Times, who lauded Chimo for transforming herself into two characters so distinct from one another, commenting, "If, at the same time, you could meet the shy, expressionless Lauren, mumbling into the wall of her red hoodie, and the glittering, claws-extended Regan, the meanest predator on the hunt, it would be hard to believe that they are the same person underneath. And maybe they aren’t — even if the actress Tracee Chimo channeled those characters to critical acclaim in two Off-Broadway plays this season." Chimo's performance in Mirror was also singled out by Elisabeth Vincentelli of the New York Post, who called her "a master of the comic silent reaction."

In 2012, Charles Isherwood of The New York Times, who also noted Chimo's performances in these two productions, called her work in the Broadway revival of Harvey "excellent". Echoing other critic's, Isherwood stated, "What's most startling about this actress is her versatility: she seems to be almost physically transformed from performance to performance, so deeply does she burrow into her characters’ identities. I didn’t recognize her at all, with her hair a frizzy nimbus of angry-looking dark curls and her face scrubbed free of makeup, in keeping with Daphna’s righteous self-seriousness."

In 2016, TBS premiered the TV comedy series People of Earth, on which Chimo plays Chelsea Healey.

Awards and nominations
2014 Lucille Lortel Win for "Outstanding Lead Actress in a Play" for Bad Jews

2013 Outer Critics Circle Award nomination for "Outstanding Lead Actress - Bad Jews

2013 Drama League Award nomination for "Distinguished Performance - Bad Jews

2013 Rising Star Award - Winner from the Salem State University Alumni Association

2011 Stage Scene Award LA for "Best Performance by a Featured Actress in a Drama" for her work in Neil LaBute's The Break of Noon

2011 Clarence Derwent Award on June 14 for "Most Promising Actress in New York City"

2011 Lucille Lortel Nomination for "Outstanding Lead Actress" in Bachelorette

2010 Drama Desk Award for "Outstanding Ensemble Performance" in Circle Mirror Transformation

2010 Obie Award for Circle Mirror Transformation

2010 Lucille Lortel Nomination for "Outstanding Featured Actress" in Circle Mirror Transformation

Filmography

Film

Television

Theatre

References

External links

 

1983 births
Living people
American people of Albanian descent
American people of Italian descent
American people of Irish descent
21st-century American actresses
Actresses from Massachusetts
People from Saugus, Massachusetts